The 1975 Cotton Bowl Classic was played between the Baylor Bears and the Penn State Nittany Lions.

Background
Baylor did the Miracle on the Brazos, winning the Southwest Conference championship for the first time since 1924, doing so after starting the season 0–2 by going 8–1 the rest of the way. They only lost one conference game (to A&M, who had two), but their most memorable win was against Texas, in which they came back from a 24–7 halftime deficit and beat the Longhorns for the first time in 17 years. This was Baylor's first Cotton Bowl Classic. The Nittany Lions were making their third appearance and second in the decade.

Game summary
Steve Beaird gave the Bears the lead when he scored on a 4-yard touchdown run as the first quarter ended. Penn State retaliated with a Chris Bahr field goal with 1:09 left to narrow the lead to 7–3 at halftime. The Nittany Lions scored first with a Tom Donchez touchdown run. Baylor scored back with a Ricky Thompson touchdown catch from Neal Jeffrey. But Penn state scored on a Jimmy Cefalo catch from Tom Shuman as the Nittany Lions led 17–14 going into the fourth quarter. Things started to fall apart for the Bears in the fourth quarter. Jimmy Cefalo scored on a touchdown run to increase the lead. Bahr added in a field goal, and Mike Johnson intercepted a pass which led to a Shuman touchdown run.
Running out of time, Thompson caught a touchdown pass from Mark Jackson with :14 left, missing the conversion. To add insult to injury, Joe Jackson returned the ensuing kickoff for a touchdown, making it 41–20 as the final seconds ticked off, giving Penn State their second Cotton Bowl Classic win.

Statistics

References

Cotton Bowl Classic
Cotton Bowl Classic
Baylor Bears football bowl games
Penn State Nittany Lions football bowl games
January 1975 sports events in the United States
Cotton Bowl